Nicholaus Joseph Williams (born September 24, 1987), better known by his stage name Trinidad James (often stylized as Trinidad Jame$), is a Trinidadian-American rapper. In 2012, he signed a recording contract with Def Jam Recordings. The label dropped him in 2014 when he failed to release an album, although he continues to release music as an independent artist and is signed to Artist Publishing Group for songwriting.

Early life 
Nicholaus Williams was born in Port of Spain, Trinidad and Tobago. His family moved to Canada and Florida before settling in the Bronx, New York City. As a child, he went to Catholic school. He has stated he cannot remember any parts of his life before the age of seven because of a head injury. In the eighth grade, he moved to Atlanta, where he began playing basketball. He began rapping in November 2011. He has listed Jay-Z, Cam'ron, T.I., and Young Jeezy as his influences.

Career 
In 2012, James released his official debut single, called "All Gold Everything", which charted in the top 40 of the US Billboard Hot 100. The song was taken from his official debut mixtape, titled Don't Be S.A.F.E. (Sensitive As Fuck Everyday), which was released on July 31, 2012, and officially re-released with a music video on October 16, 2012. On December 13, 2012, it was announced James had signed a joint venture with Def Jam Records for approximately $2 million. In January, Def Jam re-released Don't Be S.A.F.E to iTunes, which included the remix to "All Gold Everything" featuring 2 Chainz, T.I., and Young Jeezy.

On August 6, 2013, he announced that he would be releasing his second mixtape, titled 10 PC Mild, on August 13. After months of not releasing any new music, James announced that he had been dropped from Def Jam on August 1, 2014. He also indicated that instead of releasing his album through the label, he would make it available for free, and that the producers and rappers who contributed to the project should not expect any compensation because he had "no money." In April 2016, James released the single "Just a Lil' Thick (She Juicy)" featuring Mystikal and Lil Dicky. On December 31, 2016, James released a mixtape "The Wake Up 2" to streaming services such as Spotify and to mixtape websites alike.

On June 9, 2018, James released a single titled "M.M.M. (Marilyn Maryland Marilyn)" to streaming services. The music video, directed by Mike Marasco was uploaded to YouTube on the same day.

On November 27, 2019, in an interview with popular rap talk show "No Jumper", James stated that his current favorite rappers were "Doja Cat and Lil Nas X, I love those guys, partly because their flows remind me of myself"  and later in the interview when asked about what his hopes for his current favorite rappers James proclaimed "I would hate to see them quit. You know. The last thing I'd want to see is for them to fall off just like I have."

As of 2018, James is a host on a YouTube talk show, Full Size Run. and he appeared in the Safdie Brothers' film Uncut Gems.

Discography

Mixtapes

Singles

As lead artist

As featured artist

Guest appearances

Music videos

Notes

References

External links 
 

1987 births
Living people
American music industry executives
American rappers of Trinidad and Tobago descent
APRA Award winners
Businesspeople from Georgia (U.S. state)
Def Jam Recordings artists
Rappers from Atlanta
Southern hip hop musicians
Trinidad and Tobago emigrants to the United States
21st-century American rappers